Noel Ernest Jones (1919–1986) was an Australian World War II veteran and premiership winning rugby league footballer who played in the 1940s.

Playing career
Jones played five seasons for St George between 1940 and 1947 in a career interrupted by WWII.

He joined the AIF in 1943, saw action as a Gunner and post-war rejoined the Dragons for two seasons.  He retired at the conclusion of the 1947 season.

Death
Jones died on 1 June 1986, aged 66.

Published sources
 Whiticker, Alan & Hudson, Glen (2006) The Encyclopedia of Rugby League Players, Gavin Allen Publishing, Sydney
 Haddan, Steve (2007) The Finals - 100 Years of National Rugby League Finals, Steve Haddan Publishing, Brisbane

References

St. George Dragons players
Australian rugby league players
1919 births
1986 deaths
Rugby league centres
Rugby league players from Sydney
Australian Army personnel of World War II
Australian Army soldiers